Henry Joseph Miller (July 17, 1917 – August 30, 1972) was an American Negro league pitcher for the Newark Eagles and Philadelphia Stars between 1938 and 1948.

A native of Glenolden, Pennsylvania, Miller spent the majority of his Negro league career with Philadelphia. He was selected to play in the 1947 East–West All-Star Game, and hurled two shutout innings. In 1951, he played minor league baseball for the San Diego Padres of the Pacific Coast League.

Miller died in Philadelphia, Pennsylvania in 1972 at age 55.

References

External links
 and Seamheads

1917 births
1972 deaths
Newark Eagles players
Philadelphia Stars players
San Diego Padres (minor league) players
Baseball pitchers
Baseball players from Pennsylvania
People from Glenolden, Pennsylvania
20th-century African-American sportspeople